Bedrock City can refer to a number of Flintstone theme parks: 

Bedrock City (Arizona)
Bedrock City (South Dakota)
Dinotown, formerly called "Bedrock City"